Men's Overall World Cup 1981/1982

Final point standings

In Men's Overall World Cup 1981/82 the best five downhills, best five giant slaloms, best five slaloms and best three combined count.

References
 fis-ski.com

World Cup
FIS Alpine Ski World Cup overall titles